The Federal Detention Center (FDC Oakdale) was a United States federal prison which housed male detainees, for the U.S. Immigration, Customs and Enforcement (ICE). ICE used the facility for temporary housing of federal immigration detainees in Louisiana. It was part of the Oakdale Federal Correctional Complex (FCC) and was operated by the Federal Bureau of Prisons, a division of the United States Department of Justice. The facility also has an adjacent satellite prison camp for minimum-security male inmates.

FDC Oakdale is located in central Louisiana, 35 miles south of Alexandria and 58 miles north of Lake Charles.

See also

List of U.S. federal prisons
Federal Bureau of Prisons
Incarceration in the United States

References

External links
Official website

Prisons in Louisiana
Buildings and structures in Allen Parish, Louisiana
Oakdale